Copia is the fourth album from Portland, Oregon ambient musician Matthew Cooper, under the name Eluvium. The album features many more instruments than much of Cooper's past material, such as brass and string instruments. The cover illustration is Jeannie Paske's watercolor and ink, titled In Search of a View.

Track listing
 "Amreik" – 3:18
 "Indoor Swimming at the Space Station" – 10:29
 "Seeing You Off the Edges" – 5:03
 "Prelude for Time Feelers" – 5:48
 "Requiem on Frankfort Ave." – 2:41
 "Radio Ballet" – 3:12
 "(Intermission)" – 0:50
 "After Nature" – 1:51
 "Reciting the Airships" – 4:35
 "Ostinato" – 6:08
 "Hymn #1" – 1:32
 "Repose in Blue" – 9:18

References

2007 albums
Eluvium (musician) albums
Temporary Residence Limited albums